Adriano Félix Teixeira (born 7 April 1973) is a Brazilian retired footballer who played as a central defender, and is a manager.

Club career
Adriano was born in Fortaleza, Ceará, and made his debut as a senior with Ferroviário in 1992, in Série C. The following year he moved to neighbouring Sport, spending three full seasons in Série A.

Adriano moved abroad in the 1996 summer, signing for La Liga club Celta de Vigo. He made his debut in the competition on 8 December, coming on as a first half substitute in a 2–1 home win against Racing de Ferrol.

Despite appearing in 20 matches during his first year, Adriano returned to his homeland in 1997 after agreeing to a one-year loan deal at Fluminense. He returned to the Galicians in the following year, and appeared rarely before moving to Segunda División club SD Compostela in January 2000.

At Compos Adriano established himself as a regular starter, scoring a career-best seven goals in 2001–02 as his side achieved promotion from Segunda División B. In 2003, after suffering relegation (his second at the club), he joined third-tier club Cultural y Deportiva Leonesa.

Adriano returned to Brazil in 2005, and subsequently represented Vasco da Gama and Santa Cruz, retiring with the latter in 2007 at the age of 34. In 2014, he returned to the latter, being appointed assistant manager.

In 2016 Adriano was in charge of the first team during three times, all of them as an interim, following the dismissals of Marcelo Martelotte, Milton Mendes and Doriva.

Honours

Club
Sport
Campeonato Pernambucano: 1994, 1996
Copa do Nordeste: 1994

International
Brazil U20
Toulon Tournament: 1995

References

External links

1973 births
Living people
Sportspeople from Fortaleza
Brazilian footballers
Association football defenders
Campeonato Brasileiro Série A players
Campeonato Brasileiro Série B players
Campeonato Brasileiro Série C players
Ferroviário Atlético Clube (CE) players
Sport Club do Recife players
Fluminense FC players
CR Vasco da Gama players
Santa Cruz Futebol Clube players
La Liga players
Segunda División players
Segunda División B players
RC Celta de Vigo players
SD Compostela footballers
Cultural Leonesa footballers
Brazil under-20 international footballers
Brazilian expatriate footballers
Brazilian expatriate sportspeople in Spain
Expatriate footballers in Spain
Brazilian football managers
Campeonato Brasileiro Série A managers
Santa Cruz Futebol Clube managers